is a backstroke swimmer from Japan. He represented his native country at the 2004 Summer Olympics in Athens, Greece. There, he won two bronze medals in the 100 m backstroke and as a member of the 4 × 100 m medley relay team.

References
 databaseOlympics
 Morita on JOC-site

1984 births
Living people
Olympic swimmers of Japan
Swimmers at the 2004 Summer Olympics
Swimmers at the 2008 Summer Olympics
Olympic bronze medalists for Japan
Place of birth missing (living people)
Olympic bronze medalists in swimming
World Aquatics Championships medalists in swimming
Asian Games medalists in swimming
Swimmers at the 2002 Asian Games
Medalists at the 2004 Summer Olympics
Japanese male backstroke swimmers
Asian Games bronze medalists for Japan
Medalists at the 2002 Asian Games
21st-century Japanese people